Capital One Tower is a high-rise office building in Capital One Center, a mixed-use development adjacent to the McLean station in Tysons, Virginia. Ground was broken on the tower in November 2014 and it was completed in 2018. It is the headquarters of Capital One. Capital One Tower is one of many skyscrapers that have been constructed for the urbanization project in Tysons, Virginia. 

When complete, Capital One Center will contain over 5 million square feet of development, including a 1.2 acre public skypark, performing arts center, hotel, Wegmans supermarket, restaurants, and other retail.

See also
 List of tallest buildings in Virginia
 List of tallest buildings in Tysons, Virginia

References

Skyscraper office buildings in Virginia
Tysons, Virginia
Capital One
Office buildings completed in 2018
2018 establishments in Virginia
Bank company headquarters in the United States
HKS, Inc. buildings